Bhimrao Tapkir is an Indian politician and member of the Bharatiya Janata Party. Tapkir is a member of the Maharashtra Legislative Assembly in 2011 (Bypoll), 2014, 2019 from the  Khadakwasla constituency assembly constituency in Pune.

Political career 
MLA Bhimrao Tapkir starter his career in 2001 local body election of Pune Municipal Corporation.

He was elected as the Corporator in 2001 election and was re-elected as the corporator in 2006 Pune Municipal Corporation election.

In 2011 after the death of the Maharashtra Navnirman Sena Firebrand MLA Ramesh Wanjale he was elected as MLA from Khadakwasala Assembly constituency from the BJP.

In 2014 Maharashtra Legislative Assembly election he was elected twice by defeating NCP Candidate Dilip Barate.

In 2019 Maharashtra Legislative Assembly election, he was elected thrice by defeating the NCP Candidate Sachin Dodke.

References 

Politicians from Pune
Bharatiya Janata Party politicians from Maharashtra
Maharashtra MLAs 2014–2019
Living people
Marathi politicians
1960 births